Horncastle News is a weekly newspaper which serves Horncastle, Lincolnshire, England and the surrounding area.

It was founded in 1885 by William Kirkham Morton, who already owned a printing and stationery business in the town.

In 1958, the News and Mortons of Horncastle were facing closure when they were bought by Charles Edward “Teddy” Sharpe, owner of the Market Rasen Mail.

In 2001, the Horncastle News and Market Rasen Mail were sold to Johnston Press.

According to data from analysts JICREG, weekly circulation of Horncastle News was 4,936 in the period January–June 2009.

References

External links 
 Horncastle News Homepage
 Mortons of Horncastle

Mass media in Lincolnshire
Newspapers published by Johnston Press
Horncastle